is a Japanese voice actress from Tokyo, Japan. She is affiliated with 81 Produce.

Filmography

Anime
2009
Jewelpet as Rinko Kougyoku
2010
Haiyoru! Nyaruani: Remember My Mr. Lovecraft as Nyarue

2011
Kimi to Boku as Kyoko Mamiya
Last Exile: Fam, the Silver Wing as Johann (young); Primula
Pretty Rhythm: Aurora Dream as Rizumu Amamiya

2012
Jormungand as Maurice
Jormungand: Perfect Order as Maurice
Kimi to Boku 2 as Kyoko Mamiya
Last Exile: Fam, the Silver Wing as Navi-kun; Sorūsh (14-years old)
Pretty Rhythm: Dear My Future as Rizumu Amamiya
Sengoku Collection as Beheading God Bokuden Tsukahara
Sket Dance as Nori-chan
Tanken Driland as Hiawy

2013
Aku no Hana as Mayu Miyake
Arpeggio of Blue Steel ~Ars Nova~ as Makie Osakabe
Love Live! =School Idol Project as Mika
Pretty Rhythm: Rainbow Live as Femini; Poppin; Rina Uchida
Sunday Without God as Deceased; Serika; Sphere; Volrath Fahren

2014
Inari, Konkon, Koi Iroha as Kon
Age 12 as Kokoa

2015
The Idolmaster Cinderella Girls as Mio Honda
Aikatsu! as Tomoyo Shirozawa
The Idolmaster Cinderella Girls 2nd Season as Mio Honda

2016
KonoSuba as Luna
Age 12: A Little Heart-Pounding as Kokoa Hamana
JoJo's Bizarre Adventure: Diamond Is Unbreakable as Reimi Sugimoto

2017
The Idolmaster Cinderella Girls Theater (4 seasons from April 2017 to June 2019)

2018
Laid-Back Camp as Chiaki Ōgaki
Captain Tsubasa as Sanae Nakazawa

2020
Room Camp as Chiaki Ōgaki

2021
Laid-Back Camp (season 2) as Chiaki Ōgaki

2022
Laid-Back Camp Movie as Chiaki Ōgaki

Video games 
2011
The Idolmaster Cinderella Girls as Mio Honda

2013
Puyopuyo!! Quest as Chico

2015
Cross Ange: Rondo of Angels and Dragons tr. as Naomi

2018
Dragalia Lost as Philia and Yachiyo
Kirara Fantasia as Ōgaki Chiaki

2019
Azur Lane as Z36

2020
 Captain Tsubasa: Rise of New Champions as Sanae Nakazawa 

2021
 Tales of Arise as Rinwell

Dubbing 
Thomas & Friends as Alice

References

External links
 

1988 births
81 Produce voice actors
Voice actresses from Tokyo
Japanese video game actresses
Japanese voice actresses
Living people
21st-century Japanese actresses